Huanghuagang Station is a station on the Guangzhou Metro Line 6 located under the Yuexiu District of Guangzhou. It started operation on 28December 2013.

Station layout

Exits

References

Railway stations in China opened in 2013
Guangzhou Metro stations in Yuexiu District